Durzona Airport   is an airstrip in the Gracias a Dios Department of Honduras used by the U.S. military and Honduran army.

The airfield is used in a joint US military and Honduran effort to combat the illegal narcotics trade. The U.S. effort is led by Joint Task Force-Bravo stationed at Soto Cano Air Base, Honduras and the Honduran 5th Infantry Battalion. The airfield was once used by Col. Oliver North to fund the Contras in Nicaraqua during the Iran-Contra affair.

See also

Transport in Honduras
List of airports in Honduras

References

External links

Airports in Honduras